Aliens (Chinese: 异类) is the second album of Chinese singer Hua Chenyu. The international version was released on December 18, 2015.

Tracking listing

MV

Charts

Billboard - China V Chart

References

External links
iTunes
Spotify

2015 albums
Hua Chenyu albums